Jeong Woo-jae (Hanja: 鄭宇宰; born 28 June 1992) is a South Korean footballer who plays as full back for Jeju United.

Career
Jeong was selected by Seongnam FC in the 2014 K League draft. He played only two games for the club in 2014 and transferred to Chungju Hummel FC for 2015. He moved to Daegu FC in January 2016 after a successful season with Chungju.

Honors and awards

Player
Seongnam FC
 Korean FA Cup Winners (1) : 2014

Daegu FC
 Korean FA Cup Winners (1) : 2018

References

External links 

1992 births
Living people
Association football defenders
South Korean footballers
Seongnam FC players
Chungju Hummel FC players
Daegu FC players
Jeju United FC players
K League 1 players
K League 2 players